Nium is a Singapore-headquartered cross-border payments company. Initially founded by Prajit Nanu and Michael Bermingham, and launched as consumer-remittance platform Instarem in 2014. In 2016, the company introduced its B2B payments platform and rebranded as Nium in 2019, subsequently elevating Pratik Gandhi to co-founder in 2021.

History 
Founders Prajit Nanu and Michael Bermingham developed a solution to provide transparent and secure cross-border remittances for overseas money transfers with close to live exchange rates. Instarem was incorporated based on the premise of instant online remittances.

By 2017, the company had begun to operate a cross-border payments platform targeted at business users, including banks and businesses. It opened offices in the UK, Hong Kong, Malaysia, acquiring Electronic Money Transfer licenses in Malaysia and the EU. It hit $1 billion USD in dollars processed in the same year. In 2018, real-time delivery of funds reached 50+ countries and the company launched its card-issuing platform. Subsequently, in 2019, the company rebranded to Nium with the launch of the Nium platform, with Instarem continuing to operate as a wholly-owned consumer service.

In 2021, the company made its first acquisitions: Ixaris, a travel payments optimization firm and then Wirecard Forex, a payments services company in India. In April 2022, Nium acquired the alternative payments network Socash.

Also in 2021, the International Cricket Council (ICC) and Nium entered a multi-year strategic partnership involving and integrating several global ICC events through the end of 2023 - the ICC Men's T20 World Cup in the United Arab Emirates and Oman; the ICC Men's T20 World Cup in Australia; the ICC Women’s World Cup in South Africa; the ICC World Test Championship Final in 2023; and, the ICC Men's Cricket World Cup 2023 to be hosted in India.

In January 2022, Nium strengthened its senior leadership team by appointing Robin Gandhi as Chief Product Officer. Before joining Nium, Gandhi led the product, engineering, design, and operations efforts at TripActions, after previous stints at Adyen.

In March 2022, Nium announced the appointment of Dylan Lowrey to General Counsel. Lowrey joined Nium in 2021 as Head of Regulatory Affairs and Product Law. Before it, Dylan led the global Payments Product Legal team at Stripe and served as Vice President and Acting US Head of Legal for Corporate Banking at Barclays.

Nium announced on 26 April 2022 its agreement to acquire Socash Pte Ltd, a Singapore alternative payments network focused on non-traditional physical outlets. The acquisition also provided Nium with the International Remittance Hub license from Bank Negara Malaysia (the country's central bank). In May, it announced the availability of real-time payments in Malaysia. And now, Nium processes more than 80% of transactions worldwide in real-time.

From June 2022, Nium has partnered with the Stellar Development Foundation (SDF), a non-profit that supports the growth of public blockchain Stellar, to enable payouts to 190 countries.

In August 2022, Nium announced the appointment of Ramana Satyavarapu as Chief Technology Officer. Satyavarapu brings over 20 years of software engineering expertise from Microsoft, Google, Uber, Two Sigma and Finix.

In October 2022, Nium teamed with B2B2C crypto infrastructure platform Zero Hash in a partnership that lets Nium's U.S. customers leverage crypto to fiat payment solutions.

Also, In October, Nium appointed two new board members, Huey Lin and David Yates. The new independent directors have guided several organizations through stages of rapid growth. Huey Lin is a venture partner with GGV Capital, while David Yates is an executive partner at Siris Capital Group.

In November 2022, Nium launched a closed-loop payments solution, Nium Airline Payments (NAP), powered by Universal Air Travel Plan (UATP). NAP provides airlines, travel agents, and online travel agencies (OTAs) sustainable closed-loop payment model.

In December 2022, Paycell, Türkiye's digital payment platform, announced a strategic partnership with Nium to offer international money transfers from account to account using Nium's business payments infrastructure.

Investors and funding 
In January 2015, Global Founders Capital, Germany-based Venture Capital arm of Rocket Internet Founders, invested US$500,000 as seed round of funding in Instarem that helped the company develop its money transfer platform.

In March 2016, Instarem received an investment of US$5 million in Series A from Vertex Ventures Southeast Asia & India (part of the Vertex Holdings network of funds), Fullerton Financial Holdings and Global Founders Capital, to acquire licenses for money transfer business in other markets.

This was followed by Series B round of US$13 million in July 2017, led by GSR ventures, with participation from SBI-FMO Ventures, Vertex Ventures Southeast Asia & India, Fullerton Financial Holdings, and Global Founders Capital. The company will use this investment to further build its global payment infrastructure by way of increasing its payment corridors from 150 to around 2000.

In November 2018, the company raised a Series C round of over $20 million, directed towards growth in new emerging markets in Latin America and Europe.

This was followed by a private equity investment round of over $20 million ref in May 2020 by BRI Ventures, the corporate venture division of Bank BRI of Indonesia, and Visa.

By July 2021, the company had raised a Series D round of USD$200M, led by Riverwood Capital with participation from Temasek, GIC, Visa, Vertex Ventures, Atinum Capital, Beacon Venture Capital and Rocket Capital Investment. The company has since been characterized as a “unicorn.” Its valuation as of February 2022 is estimated at $2bn.

See also 
 Remittances
 Money services business
 Foreign exchange market
 Financial technology

References 

Financial services companies established in 2014
Online remittance providers
2014 establishments in Singapore
Companies of Singapore
Financial technology
Foreign exchange market